Khaled Dawoud is the former leader of the Constitution Party of Egypt. Dawoud has been a journalist for Al-Ahram Weekly since 1996. Dawoud resigned as a spokesperson for the National Salvation Front (NSF) on 16 August 2013 in protest at the support of police violence against Mohamed Morsi supporters by the NSF. Dawoud was stabbed by Mohammed Morsi supporters on 4 October 2013.

Arrest during 2019 Egyptian protests
Following video releases by Mohamed Ali in September 2019 accusing Sisi of corruption and calling for anti-Sisi street protests, Dawoud called for investigations of the corruption claims. He was arrested on 25 September 2019, after protests across Egypt started on 21 and 22 September. On 14 April 2020, Dawoud was released from jail.

References

Living people
Egyptian politicians
Egyptian journalists
Year of birth missing (living people)